"How Long Will I Love You?" is a song by folk rock band the Waterboys from their fifth studio album, Room to Roam (1990). Written by Mike Scott, it was released as the album's lead single. The song was subsequently covered by English singer Ellie Goulding and released as the second single from her album Halcyon Days (2013). Goulding's version is included on the soundtrack to the 2013 film About Time, which also features a different cover by Jon Boden, Sam Sweeney and Ben Coleman.

Release
"How Long Will I Love You?" was given a single release in Ireland and certain European countries, but not the UK or US. A special sleeve was designed for the single's release in Ireland. The B-side, "Come Live with Me", is a cover of the Felice and Boudleaux Bryant-penned song. The Waterboys recorded the song after Anthony Thistlethwaite attended a Ray Charles concert and fell in love with the song. It was recorded during the sessions for Fisherman's Blues, but it was not released at the time. After appearing on a UK bootleg, it received its first official release on the "How Long Will I Love You?" single.

Track listings
Ireland 12-inch single and German CD single
"How Long Will I Love You?" – 2:49
"When Will We Be Married?" – 2:57
Traditional. Arranged by Mike Scott and Steve Wickham. Produced by Mike Scott and John Dunford.
"Come Live with Me" – 7:23
Composed by Felice and Boudleaux Bryant. Produced by Mike Scott.

French and German 7-inch single
11"Come Live with Me" – 7:23
Composed by Felice and Boudleaux Bryant. Produced by Mike Scott.

Charts

Ellie Goulding version

"How Long Will I Love You" was covered by English singer Ellie Goulding for Halcyon Days (2013), the reissue of her second studio album, Halcyon (2012). Released on 10 November 2013 as the second single from the reissue, it also served as the official song for the BBC's 2013 Children in Need appeal. It is also on the soundtrack to the 2013 Richard Curtis film About Time, although her version is not featured in the film itself. Goulding performed "How Long Will I Love You" live in the BBC Children in Need appeal show on BBC One on 15 November 2013.

"She changed a couple of the lines", Mike Scott said of Goulding's version. "I'm not sure if she did it deliberately. I don't think they're as good as the original lines, but good for her. I do the same thing myself. I've changed Dylan's words, so I can't really complain if somebody changes mine."

Commercial performance
"How Long Will I Love You" was a commercial success for Goulding and notably a bigger success than its original. It peaked at number three on the UK Singles Chart, selling 82,872 copies. It reached the top ten in a total of 7 charts, and reached the top twenty in a total of 11 charts. Since its release it has appeared on 16 different charts. The song has appeared inside the top 50 and the UK year end list in both 2013 and 2014 respectively.

In Goulding's native United Kingdom it has been Certified 2x platinum for sales of 1,200,000 Unites and sales. It has been certified Gold in 6 countries, Australia, the United States, New Zealand, Denmark, Sweden and Belgium. 

The music video for "How Long Will I Love You" was directed by Mike Sharpe and released on 9 September 2013. The video shows Goulding walking along a beach, intercut with footage from About Time.

A second music video premiered on Goulding's official Vevo channel on 28 October 2013, and contains scenes from the short film Tom & Issy, directed by Roger Michell and starring Goulding and Dylan Edwards. The video was shot entirely on a Nokia Lumia 1020.

Track listing
UK CD single and digital download
"How Long Will I Love You" – 2:34

Credits and personnel
Credits adapted from the liner notes of Halcyon Days.

Recording
 Mixed at Sentinel Sound
 Mastered at Whitfield Mastering (London, England)

Personnel
 Ellie Goulding – vocals
 John Fortis – production, bass, keyboards
 Joe Kearns – engineering
 Richard Kayvan – engineering, mixing
 Ashley Krajewski – engineering, percussion
 Nick Cornu – guitar
 Chris Ketley – piano
 Kirsty Mangan – violin, viola
 Rachael Lander – cello
 Naweed – mastering

Charts

Weekly charts

Year-end charts

Certifications

Release history

References

1990 singles
1990 songs
2013 singles
Children in Need singles
Ellie Goulding songs
Polydor Records singles
Pop ballads
Song recordings produced by Barry Beckett
Song recordings produced by Mike Scott (musician)
Songs written by Mike Scott (musician)
Songs written for films
The Waterboys songs